This is the complete list of Asian Winter Games medalists in snowboarding from 2003 to 2017.

Men

Halfpipe

Slalom

Giant slalom

Women

Halfpipe

Slalom

Giant slalom

References

External links
 2003 Results
 2007 Results

Snowboarding
medalists